The World Diving Championships are a biennial international sports competition organized by FINA since 1973 as part of the FINA World Aquatics Championships.

Editions
Diving start with competitions at the 1973 World Aquatics Championships.

All-time medal table 1973–2022
Updated after the 2022 World Aquatics Championships.

See also
 
 FINA Diving World Cup
 FINA Diving World Series
 FINA World Aquatics Championships
 FINA World Junior Diving Championships
 List of World Aquatics Championships medalists in diving

References

External links
 FINA official web site
 Diving / World Championships
 WORLD SWIMMING CHAMPIONSHIPS (1973-2005) at Gbrathletics.com

 
Biennial sporting events
Recurring sporting events established in 1973
International diving competitions